Ernest Dixon may refer to:

 Ernest T. Dixon, Jr. (died 1996), American Bishop of the United Methodist Church
 Ernest Dixon (American football) (born 1971), former professional American football linebacker
 Ernest Dixon (cricketer) (1854–1889), New Zealand cricketer
 Blue Dixon (Ernest Joseph Dixon, c. 1885–c. 1941), Australian rugby union player
 Ernie Dixon (1901–1941), footballer

See also